The St. Thomas (Minnesota) Tommies women's ice hockey team represents the University of St. Thomas (Minnesota) in NCAA Division I competition in the Western Collegiate Hockey Association (WCHA).

History
St. Thomas played their first varsity game during the 1998–99 season. In the last 20 years, the Tommies have never had a losing season. They finished third or better in the MIAC every year. In the program's 23-year history at the NCAA Division III level, the Tommies have won six conference championships, six conference tournament titles and reached the NCAA Division III frozen four once.

In 2019 the MIAC took the unprecedented step of removing St. Thomas from its membership because of concerns about “athletic competitive parity.” Because the removal affected all sports and was effective at the end of the 2020–21 season, St. Thomas had time to decide what it would do next. The women's ice hockey program was given the green light to jump directly to the Division I level in July 2020. The women's hockey team joined the WCHA for the 2021–22 season.

In 2023, St. Thomas announced plans for the new Lee and Penny Anderson Arena, with the team planned to begin playing its home games there in the fall of 2025.

Current roster
As of August 21, 2022.

Head coaches
As of completion of the 2021–22 season

Season-by-season results

References

External links
Official Home Page

 
Ice hockey teams in Minnesota
Ice hockey clubs established in 1998
1998 establishments in Minnesota
University of St. Thomas (Minnesota)